Frank Joseph MacKey (March 20, 1852 in Gilboa, New York – February 24, 1927 in Minneapolis, Minnesota) was an American polo player in the 1900 Summer Olympics. He was part of the Foxhunters Hurlingham polo team which won the gold medal. He also was a businessman, founding HSBC Finance in 1878. In 1927, he committed suicide by shooting himself while suffering from a terminal illness.

References

External links

 
 

1852 births
1927 suicides
People from Schoharie County, New York
American polo players
Polo players at the 1900 Summer Olympics
Olympic polo players of the United States
Olympic gold medalists for the United States
Medalists at the 1900 Summer Olympics
Suicides by firearm in Minnesota
American bankers
19th-century American businesspeople
Olympic medalists in polo